The State Theatre, officially State Theatre Center for the Arts, is a 1,500-seat historic theater located in the City of Easton, Northampton County, Pennsylvania.

History

The building began to take its present form in 1910, when modified from a bank building to a vaudeville theater, called the Neumeyers Vaudeville House. The building was extensively modified in 1926, to include a larger auditorium, balcony, and lush decorations; at that time it was renamed "The State."  The building is asymmetrical with a cut stone Beaux-Arts style facade and large overhanging marquee.

The theater has hosted the Freddy Awards, which honor the best in high school theater programs in the Lehigh Valley, every year since the inaugural show in 2003.

It was added to the National Register of Historic Places in 1982.

References

External links

State Theatre Center for the Arts website

Theatres on the National Register of Historic Places in Pennsylvania
Beaux-Arts architecture in Pennsylvania
Theatres completed in 1926
Buildings and structures in Northampton County, Pennsylvania
1926 establishments in Pennsylvania
National Register of Historic Places in Northampton County, Pennsylvania
Individually listed contributing properties to historic districts on the National Register in Pennsylvania